Bhupatgad Fort is a fort in Palghar district in the Jawhar taluka in  Maharashtra state of India.

Location
The fort is located about 130 km from Thane. The nearest town is Jawhar. This fort lay about 30 km East of the Jawhar town  on northern spur of hills that run east from Jawhar. The Fort is situated near the villages Kurlod and Zaap.

Places to see
This fort can be reached after an easy trek of one hour from the base village Kurlod or Zaap. There are no proper fortifications or bastions left on the fort except for two entrance gates in ruined state . There are few rock cut water cisterns  and  statues of Mhasoba and Hanuman on the fort.

History
Very less history of this fort is known. This fort was important to keep watch over the Trimbak-Wada trade route. This fort was in the Jawhar princely state till 1947.

References 

Buildings and structures of the Maratha Empire	
Forts in Palghar district
16th-century forts in India